Murder Anonymous is a 1955 British crime short film directed by Ken Hughes and featuring Edgar Lustgarten, Peter Arne and Jill Bennett.

It was made by Anglo-Amalgamated as support for feature film screenings in cinemas as part of the Scotland Yard film series.

Plot
The death of a playboy points the finger of suspicion at Bowman (Arthur Lovegrove), in whose divorce suit the dead man had been named.

Cast

Edgar Lustgarten as Host
Peter Arne as Douglas Sheldon
Jill Bennett as Mrs. Sheldon
Ewen Solon as Inspector Conway
Brian O'Higgins as Detective Sergeant
Louise Gainsborough as Mrs. Langster
Arthur Lovegrove as Bowman
Bettina Dickson as Mrs. Bowman
John Penrose as Langster
Vanda Godsell as Hotel Guest
Dervis Ward as Detective Sergeant
Alastair Hunter as Harry
Philip Ray as Police Doctor
Doug Robinson as Mr. Robinson
Frank Hawkins as Police Sergeant
Arthur Lowe as Fingerprint Expert
Joy Webster as Judo Girl
John Dunbar as Doctor
Travers Humphreys as himself

Critical reception
Sky Movies noted "Another dip into the Merton Park Studios filing cabinet that housed their short Scotland Yard mysteries, hosted by mournful-faced criminologist Edgar Lustgarten. The director is Ken Hughes, who briskly illuminates the case in question and was later to go to on bigger - if not better - subjects, including The Trials of Oscar Wilde and Mae West's last picture, Sextette."

References

External links

1955 films
1950s crime comedy films
British crime comedy films
Films directed by Ken Hughes
British comedy short films
1955 comedy films
1950s English-language films
1950s British films
British black-and-white films